The Women's Volleyball Thailand League is the top-level professional women's volleyball league in Thailand.  Contested by eight clubs, it operates on a system of promotion and relegation with the Volleyball Pro Challenge League. Seasons run from October to March, with teams playing 14 games each. Most games are played on Saturdays and Sundays, with a few games played on weekdays.

It is organized by the Thailand Volleyball Association (TVA). The league champion qualifies for the Asian Club Championship.

The league is recognized by the TVA, the FIVB, and the AVC. The league maintains strong ties with international volleyball governing bodies, adhering to the rules and regulations set by the FIVB and the AVC. The Women's Volleyball Thailand League is an FIVB-accredited club league, and its teams and players are registered with the FIVB.  It is sponsored by Daikin and therefore officially known as the Daikin Women's Volleyball Thailand League. In the Thailand League, the games are played during Fridays, Saturdays and Sunday.

Thailand League clubs
{{location map+ |Thailand |float=right |width=325 |caption=Locations of the Thailand League 2017–18 teams |places=

There are 8 clubs in the league, with two promoted teams from Pro Challenge replacing the two teams that were relegated from Thailand League following the 2016–17 season.

Members (2020–2021)

Schedule 2020–21

League table (2020–2021)

Final series table

Results summary

Champions

Awards

Most valuable player

Most Valuable Foreign Player

Best Opposite Spiker

Best Outside Spikers

Best Scorer

Best Middle Blockers

Best Setter

Best Libero

Former awards

Best Scorer

Best Server

Best Digger

Thailand League clubs in Asian Championship

 2020 did not qualify because Outbreak of Covid-19 in the world

Thailand League clubs in World Championship

See also
 Men's Volleyball Thailand League
 Volleyball Thai-Denmark Super League
 Women's Volleyball Pro Challenge

External links
 Official website 
 Statistic thailand league website 
 Volleyball thailand league